Estadio Polideportivo de Pueblo Nuevo is a multi-purpose stadium in San Cristóbal, Venezuela.  It is currently used mostly for football matches and is the home stadium of Deportivo Táchira Fútbol Club.  The stadium holds 38,755 people.

It is known as "the sacred temple of football" in Venezuela, for it is in this stadium where Venezuela had some of its best football results, and it lies in the typically football-loving Andes region, which contrasts with much of the country, where baseball is more popular.

Copa América 2007
The stadium was one of the venues of the Copa América 2007, and held the following matches:

References

External links

Video of the stadium under construction on 20 March 2007
Video of the stadium simulation

Polideportivo
Copa América stadiums
Multi-purpose stadiums in Venezuela
Buildings and structures in Táchira
Buildings and structures in San Cristóbal, Táchira
1976 establishments in Venezuela
Athletics (track and field) venues in Venezuela